Gianluca Lapadula Vargas (born 7 February 1990) is a professional footballer who plays as a striker for  club Cagliari. Born in Italy, he represents the Peru national team.

Early life
Lapadula was born in Turin on 7 February 1990, to Gianfranco Lapadula, from the region of Apulia, and Blanca Aida Vargas Higinio, a Peruvian woman. He has a brother named David, who was also a forward in the lower amateur leagues.

Lapadula is nicknamed Lapagol in Italy, and El Bambino in Peru.

Club career

Early career
Lapadula began his career with Juventus before being released in 2004 because he was not doing well in his studies. After that he moved to Collegno Paradiso, then left on loan to Treviso in 2006. He returned to Piedmont for Serie C2 side Pro Vercelli on 31 August 2007. He played for the reserve team. In the 2008–09 season, he left for Lega Pro Seconda Divisione (ex–Serie C2) side Ivrea, and was selected to the Lega Pro 2nd Div. A representative team for Lega Pro Quadrangular Tournament and scored a goal against 2nd Div. C representative team in the third place match. Eventually, Group A finished third. In August 2009 he was signed by Parma and spent one season with their Primavera team. In July 2010, he left for Atletico Roma.

Loans to Atletico Roma and Cesena
Lapadula made his debut for Atletico Roma on 8 August 2010, in the Coppa Italia preliminary round, lost in extra time (1–2). In January 2011, he left for Ravenna. He concluded the 2011–12 season as the topscorer in Group A with 24 goals.

On 15 June 2012, Lapadula joined Serie B club Cesena in co-ownership, signing a five-year contract. Lapadula failed to play regularly for Cesena, and on 8 January 2013 he was signed by Frosinone. In July 2013 the co-ownership between Cesena and Parma was resolved, and Lapadula returned to Parma.

Loans to Gorica and Teramo
Lapadula was loaned to Slovenian club ND Gorica on 1 July, along with Bright Addae, Daniele Bazzoffia, Uroš Celcer, Massimo Coda, Alex Cordaz, Sebestyén Ihrig-Farkas, Alen Jogan, Floriano Vanzo and Fabio Lebran. The deals were finalised on 12 July.

In July 2014 he was loaned to Teramo, where he scored 21 goals and helped the club achieve promotion to Serie B, then cancelled in August 2015 by the final judgement of the Italian Football Federation, due to match-fixing on the part of the President of Teramo, Luciano Campitellii, in the penultimate round of the league in the match against Savona.

Pescara
After the bankruptcy of Parma, Lapadula was released on a free transfer, and in July 2015 he was signed by Pescara in Serie B on a four-year contract. In the 2015–16 season he scored 30 goals in 43 appearances (including three goals in as many appearances in the playoffs), without scoring any penalties, earning the honour of top scorer in the Italian second division.

Milan
On 24 June 2016, Lapadula passed his medical test with A.C. Milan, who reportedly paid Pescara €9 million plus bonus for the transfer, while the player signed a five-year deal. He made his debut for Milan on 27 August 2016, coming on as an 86th-minute substitute during a 4–2 loss away against Napoli in Serie A. He scored his first goal for Milan and in Serie A on 6 November 2016 in the 2–1 away victory against Palermo, three minutes after coming on as a substitute for Carlos Bacca. On 26 November, Lapadula scored his first brace in Serie A in a 1–4 away victory against Empoli. He finished the 2016–17 season with 8 goals in 27 games, two of which were scored from a penalty spot.

Genoa
On 18 July 2017, Lapadula moved to Genoa, on a one-season loan with an obligation to make the deal permanent. The total transfer fee was €13 million (€2 million loan + €11 million for outright) which was Genoa's most expensive signing of all-time.

Loan to Lecce
On 12 July 2019, he was loaned to Serie A newcomers Lecce.

Benevento 
On 2 September 2020, Lapadula joined Benevento from Genoa on a three-year contract, for a reported fee of €4 million.

Cagliari 
On 26 July 2022, Lapadula joined Cagliari on a three-year contract.

International career
Lapadula is eligible to play for Italy and Peru as a result of his family background. He had received a call-up by Peru for the Copa América Centenario but had not officially decided which international side to represent at the time. On 7 November 2016, he was called up to the Italy senior squad for the first time for a 2018 FIFA World Cup qualification match against Liechtenstein and a friendly match against Germany, replacing the injured Napoli forward Manolo Gabbiadini.

On 31 May 2017, Lapadula scored a hat-trick for the Italy B team in a friendly against San Marino.

On 30 October 2020, Lapadula was called-up by Ricardo Gareca to the Peru senior team for 2022 FIFA World Cup qualification matches against Chile and Argentina. He made his debut on 13 November 2020, as a substitute in the match against Chile.

On 23 June 2021, he scored his first senior international goal for Peru in a 2–2 draw against Ecuador in the first round of the 2021 Copa América, later also assisting André Carrillo's goal. On 2 July, Lapadula scored once and contributed to Gustavo Gómez's own goal in a 3–3 draw against Paraguay in the quarter-finals of the competition, later also netting his nation's first penalty in the resulting 4–3 penalty shoot-out victory. On 9 July, he scored Peru's second goal in a 3–2 loss to Colombia in the third-place match of the tournament.

Style of play

A dynamic forward, Lapadula is a tenacious and physically strong striker, who stands out for his work-rate and temperament; due to his versatility, he can play as a centre-forward, and can also adapt to more creative roles, as a second striker, or winger on either flank, courtesy of his solid technical qualities, as well as his ability to both score and assist goals. An uncommonly accurate and powerful finisher, he also has a strong left foot, and an eye for goal.

Career statistics

Club

International

International goals
Scores and results list Peru's goal tally first.

Honours

Club
Gorica
Slovenian Football Cup: 2013–14

Milan
Supercoppa Italiana: 2016

Individual
Lega Pro top scorer: 2014–15 (Group A, 24 goals)
Serie B top scorer: 2015–16 (27 goals)
Gran Galà Top 11 Serie B: 2015–16

References

External links

Football.it profile 
Lega Serie B profile  
PrvaLiga profile 

1990 births
Living people
Footballers from Turin
Peruvian footballers
Peru international footballers
Italian footballers
Italy B international footballers
Peruvian people of Italian descent
Italian people of Peruvian descent
Citizens of Peru through descent
People of Apulian descent
Association football forwards
Serie A players
Serie B players
Serie C players
Slovenian PrvaLiga players
Treviso F.B.C. 1993 players
F.C. Pro Vercelli 1892 players
A.S.D. Calcio Ivrea players
Parma Calcio 1913 players
Atletico Roma F.C. players
A.C. Cesena players
ND Gorica players
A.C. Milan players
Genoa C.F.C. players
U.S. Lecce players
Benevento Calcio players
Cagliari Calcio players
2021 Copa América players
Italian expatriate footballers
Expatriate footballers in Slovenia
Italian expatriate sportspeople in Slovenia